The discography of Australian rapper and singer the Kid Laroi consists of one mixtape, one extended play (EP), 22 singles (including two as a featured artist), one promotional single, and 26 music videos. In 2018, Laroi independently released his first EP, 14 with a Dream, through SoundCloud and YouTube. He signed a joint deal with Grade A Productions and Columbia Records the next year before making his major label debut with the single "Let Her Go". Laroi built on the success of the song with other singles in early 2020, such as the US platinum-certified "Diva", which features Lil Tecca, and viral TikTok hit, "Addison Rae".

In June 2020, Laroi released a collaboration with Juice Wrld, "Go", which entered the top 40 in Australia, Canada, and New Zealand. His debut mixtape, F*ck Love, dropped a month later. The project reached number one on the ARIA Albums Chart, making him the youngest Australian solo artist to reach the chart's summit. It also eventually peaked atop the Billboard 200 following multiple reissues of the mixtape. Six singles supported the project across its three instalments, including the chart-topping songs "Without You" and "Stay", the latter being a collaboration with Justin Bieber. "Without You" became Laroi's first number-one single in Australia after releasing a remix with Miley Cyrus, while "Stay" was his first chart leader on the Billboard Hot 100.

Studio albums

Mixtapes

Extended plays

Singles

As lead artist

As featured artist

Promotional singles

Other charted and certified songs

Guest appearances

Music videos

Notes

References

External links
 The Kid Laroi at AllMusic
 

Discography
Discographies of Australian artists
Pop music discographies
Hip hop discographies